Red Men Hall may refer to:

Red Men Hall (Brunswick, Maryland), now houses a model train museum
Red Men Hall (Essex, Connecticut), listed on the National Register of Historic Places in Middlesex County, Connecticut
Red Men Hall (Index, Washington), listed on the National Register of Historic Places in Snohomish County, Washington
Red Men Hall (Los Angeles), listed as a City of Los Angeles Historic-Cultural Monument
Red Men Hall (Lovettsville, Virginia), a contributing property of the Lovettsville Historic District
Red Men Hall (Reading, Pennsylvania), listed on the National Register of Historic Places in Berks County, Pennsylvania
Red Men Hall (Waco, Texas), part of the national Red Men Museum and Library

Architectural disambiguation pages